Alexandros Vergonis (born 1 December 1985) is a retired Greek professional footballer who played as a central midfielder. He was an emblematic captain of Veria and Veria NFC, two teams located in his hometown Veria. He's now the assistant manager of Greek Super League 2 Club AEL.

Career
Vergonis scored his first two goals against Platanias in a 5–0 home win in Football League championship. On 12 April 2014, Alexandros scored the only goal in a match between Veria and Asteras Tripoli for the Superleague Greece and kept Veria in the category. Also, his goal was the 400th goal of all time for Veria in Superleague. On 23 May 2014, Alexandros signed a one-year contract extension with Veria. Vergonis scored again for Veria in a 0–2 away win against Ergotelis during the second matchday of the Greek Football Cup. Vergonis signed a one-year contract expansion on 2 June 2015.

On 26 July 2016 he joined Apollon Pontou. At the end of the season Apollon won the title and was promoted to the Football League. On 12 November 2017 he scored two goals in a 3-3 away draw against Panserraikos.

Personal life
Vergonis holds a mathematician degree.

Honours

PS Veria
Gamma Ethniki: 2018–19
Imathia Cup: 2018–19

Veria NFC
Football League: 2020–21

Individual
Football League 2 Player of the Year: 2006–07

References

External links
 

1985 births
Living people
Footballers from Veria
Super League Greece players
Football League (Greece) players
Apollon Pontou FC players
Olympiacos Volos F.C. players
Athlitiki Enosi Larissa F.C. players
Veria F.C. players
Rodos F.C. players
Veria NFC players
Association football midfielders
Greek footballers